Christmas at Our House is the 15th solo studio album by the American country artist Barbara Mandrell. The album was released in October 1984 on MCA Records and was produced by Tom Collins. It was Mandrell's first album of Christmas music.

Background and content 
Christmas at Our House, as described by Bradley Torreano of Allmusic, "shows the country star adding her name to the countless musicians who have released personalized Christmas albums." The album includes ten tracks, including some new material. It includes two tributes of the Christmas season, the title track and "From Our House to Yours", which Torreano described as "down home". It also includes cover versions of Christmas standards such as "I'll Be Home for Christmas" and "Winter Wonderland"; it also introduced what would become a holiday standard, "It Must Have Been the Mistletoe (Our First Christmas)". Torreano gave the album three out of five stars staying, "Her brand of country-pop may not appeal to all fans of the genre, but many country listeners will probably find this a nice Christmas album to play for the holidays."

Release 
Christmas at Our House was Mandrell's third album released in 1984, officially issued in October. The album peaked at #31 on the Billboard Top Country Albums chart in 1984. No singles were released from the album and it was her first album not to reach the Billboard 200 albums chart since He Set My Life to Music in 1982. Christmas at Our House was originally released as a vinyl LP record  on MCA Records in 1984, with five songs on each side. It was reissued as a compact disc by MCA many years later.

Track listing

Personnel 
 Eddie Bayers – drums
 Pete Bordonali – acoustic guitar, guitar, electric guitar
 Thomas Brannon – backing vocals
 David Briggs – piano, synthesizer
 Lori Brooks – backing vocals
 James Capps – acoustic guitar
 Jimmy Capps – guitar, piano, synthesizer
 Phillip Forest – backing vocals
 Sherilyn Huffman – backing vocals
 David Hungate – bass guitar
 John Jarvis – synthesizer
 Shane Keister – piano, synthesizer
 Barbara Mandrell – lead vocals
 Farrell Morris – percussion
 The Nashville Horn Works – horn
 Nashville String Machine – strings
 Louis Dean Nunley – backing vocals
 Brent Rowan – electric guitar
 Lisa Silver – backing vocals
 Diane Tidwell – backing vocals
 Bergen White – arrangements, string arrangements

Sales chart positions 
Album

References 

1984 Christmas albums
Christmas albums by American artists
Barbara Mandrell albums
Albums produced by Tom Collins (record producer)
MCA Records albums
Country Christmas albums